Georges Carnus (born 13 August 1940) is a French former professional footballer who played as goalkeeper. At international level, he made 36 appearances for the France national team.

Career
Carnus was part of the France national team's squad for the 1966 FIFA World Cup in England where he remained Marcel Aubour's substitute. He later signed with AS Saint-Étienne, winning his first titles. His successes with les Verts and his talent as a goalkeeper allowed him to take Aubour's titular spot in France's goal after the 1966 World Cup.In 1971, he surprisingly left Saint-Étienne, along with teammate Bernard Bosquier for Olympique de Marseille.Their combination in l'OMs defense was full of success, and Marseille won French Division 1 and Coupe de France in 1972.

HonoursSaint-ÉtienneDivision 1: 1967–68, 1968–69, 1969–70
Coupe de France: 1967–68, 1969–70Marseille'
Division 1: 1971–72
Coupe de France: 1971–72

References

External links
 
 
 
 Profile on French federation official site 

1942 births
Living people
French footballers
France international footballers
Association football goalkeepers
1966 FIFA World Cup players
Stade Français (association football) players
AS Saint-Étienne players
Olympique de Marseille players
Ligue 1 players
Pays d'Aix FC players